Italy Records is an independent record label founded in Detroit, Michigan in 1997, by self-confessed "record geek" Dave Buick. (See 1997 in music.) 
The label released its first 7" by Rocket 455 on October 31, 1997. shortly after Buick released a single by the Dirtys. Dirtys lead singer Joe Burdick claimed this was the reason Buick founded Italy Records in the first place. The label went on to release the notable 7"s from Detroit rock & roll bands, from the garage rock scene including the first two 7"s by The White Stripes (Let's Shake Hands and Lafayette Blues), the debut release from the Soledad Brothers ("Soledad), and the first single from The Greenhornes (Stayed Up Last Night). 
In its first incarnation, Italy Records released eleven 45 rpm singles and a single mini-LP called Hentch-Forth by The Hentchmen with Jack White of The White Stripes. Out of its twelve releases, Jack White featured in the production or performing of at least six.

Italy's supposed last release was Whirlwind Heat's Glaxefusion 7" in 2000. But in 2007, the Italy label was revived with a single from very popular Detroit band The Go. Buick and The Hentchmen also re-released the Hentch-Forth album, this time in CD format (re-titled Hentch-Forth.Five) and digitally on iTunes.

Discography

See also
 List of record labels

References

External links
 
 http://italyrecordsdetroit.bigcartel.com/

American record labels
Record labels established in 1997
Record labels disestablished in 2000
Record labels established in 2007
Re-established companies